The Treaty of Amity and Commerce Between the United States and Sweden, officially  A treaty of Amity and Commerce concluded between His Majesty the King of Sweden and the United States of North America, was a treaty signed on April 3, 1783 in Paris, France between the United States and the Kingdom of Sweden. The treaty officially established commercial relations between these two nations and was signed during the American Revolutionary War.

Background 
In 1783 Benjamin Franklin was the American resident in Paris, and on September 28, 1782 he was given a new assignment by Congress, and was made Minister Plenipotentiary to His Majesty King Gustav III of Sweden. However, because Franklin was based in Paris, France, the discussions were carried out via the Swedish ambassador to the court of France, Count Gustaf Philip Creutz.

On April 3, 1783, the two of them signed the treaty. Later that same year, the Treaty of Paris was signed in Paris by representatives of King George III of Great Britain and representatives of the United States of America on September 3, 1783, which ended the American Revolutionary War.

Signers

United States 
 Benjamin Franklin

Sweden 
 Count Gustaf Philip Creutz

Provisions 
 Peace and friendship between the U.S. and Sweden
 Mutual Most Favored Nation status with regard to commerce and navigation
 Mutual protection of all vessels and cargo when in U.S. or Swedish jurisdiction
 Mutual right for citizens of one country to hold land in other's territory
 Mutual right to search a ship of the other's coming out of an enemy port for contraband
 Right to due process of law if contraband is found on an allied ship and only after being Officially declared contraband may it be seized
 Mutual protection of men of war and privateers and their crews from harm from the other party and reparations to be paid if this provision is broken
 Restoration of stolen property taken by pirates
 Right of Ships of War and privateers to freely carry ships and goods taken for their enemy
 Mutual assistance, relief, and safe harbor to ships, both of War and Merchant, in crisis in the other's territory
 Neither side may commission privateers against the other nor allow foreign privateers that are enemies of either side to use their ports
 Mutual right to trade with enemy states of the other as long as those goods are not contraband
 If the two nations become enemies nine months protection of merchant ships in enemy territory
 To prevent quarrels between allies all ships must carry passports and cargo manifests
 If two ships meet Ships of War and Privateers must stay out of cannon range but may board the merchant ship to inspect her passports and manifests
 Mutual Right to inspection of a ship's cargo to only happen once
 Mutual right to have Counsuls, Vice Counsuls, Agents, and Commissaries of one nation in the other's ports

Ratification 
 The Treaty was ratified by Gustav III in Stockholm on May 23, 1783.
 The Treaty was ratified by Congress on July 29, 1783.
 The ratifications were exchanged at Paris on February 6, 1784.

See also 
 List of treaties

References

Sources 
 Giunta, Mary A., ed. Documents of the Emerging Nation:  U.S. Foreign Relations 1775–1789.  Wilmington, Del.: Scholarly Resources Inc., 1998.
 Middlekauff, Robert. The Glorious Cause:  The American Revolution, 1763–1789. New York:  Oxford University Press, 1982.
 "Treaty of Amity and Commerce," The Avalon Project at Yale Law School.   ].  Accessed 30 March 2008.

External links 
 A collection of all the treaties of peace, alliance, and commerce, between Great-Britain and other powers, from the treaty signed at Munster in 1648, to the treaties signed at Paris in 1783: To which is prefixed, A discourse on the conduct of the government of Great-Britain in respect to neutral nations
 

 The handwritten text of The U.S. Swedish Treaty of 1783 https://commons.wikimedia.org/wiki/File:1783_US_Sweden_Treaty_-_English.pdf

Treaties of Sweden
Treaties of the United States
Political history of the United States
Political history of Sweden
1783 in France
1783 in Sweden
1783 in the United States
Ordinances of the Continental Congress
1783 treaties
Sweden–United States relations
Sweden during the Gustavian era